G. robusta  may refer to:
 Gila robusta, the roundtail chub, a cyprinid fish species found in the Colorado River drainage including the Gila River and the Rio Yaqui in western North America
 Gracula robusta, the Nias myna or Nias Hill myna, a bird species endemic resident of Nias and other nearby islands off western Sumatra
 Graffenrieda robusta, a plant species endemic to Peru
 Grevillea robusta, the southern silky oak, silky-oak or Australian Silver-oak, a tree species native of eastern coastal Australia

See also
 Robusta (disambiguation)